The  is a set of modifications to Japanese law in 1998  and 2001 to move a number of public holidays in Japan to Mondays, creating three-day weekends for those with five-day work weeks. It is the Japanese equivalent of the 1968 Uniform Monday Holiday Act in the United States.

See also
 Public holidays in Japan
 Japanese calendar
 Japanese festivals
 Uniform Monday Holiday Act (similar legislation in the United States)

References

Public holidays in Japan
Monday
1998 establishments in Japan
2001 establishments in Japan